Thyra Kay Stevenson (September 4, 1944 – May 11, 2020) was an American politician from Idaho. She was a Republican member of Idaho House of Representatives from District 6 in the A seat, dying in office.

Early life and education 
Stevenson was born in Palo Alto, California, and moved to Lewiston, Idaho, with her family at the age of 13 when her father accepted a job with PotlatchDeltic. She graduated from Lewiston High School as her class's valedictorian in 1962. Stevenson earned a Bachelor of Arts degree English and another in Spanish from Boston University. She earned a certificate in Spanish from the New York University of Madrid in Spain, a Master of Arts in Spanish literature from New York University, and a PhD in Latin American literature from the University of Washington.

Career 
Stevenson began flying when she was a child. As an experienced pilot, she flew planes such as DC-3s, Convairs, Boeing 727 cargo and passenger planes.

Stevenson served in the military as an aircraft commander, Flotilla commander, and pilot instructor in the United States Coast Guard. Stevenson was also a chief information officer in the AuxAir Squadron. She was a professor of Spanish at University of Washington.

On November 6, 2012, Stevenson won the election and became a Republican member of Idaho House of Representatives for District 6 seat A. Stevenson defeated Pete Gertonson with 54.2% of the votes.

On November 4, 2014, Stevenson was defeated by Dan Rudolf with 49.9% of the votes.

On November 8, 2016, Stevenson was re-elected to her old seat in the Idaho House of Representatives. Stevenson defeated Bob Blakely with 56.55% of the votes.

Stevenson was the vice-chair of the Revenue and Taxation Committee. She died of heart problems while in office and Republican Governor Brad Little appointed Aaron von Ehlinger to the remainder of her term.

Elections

Personal life and death 
In 1978, Stevenson married Walter Noel Greenham (1941–2015), a Navy veteran and computer engineer. She had five children. Stevenson lived in California, until returning to Lewiston, Idaho after retirement. Stevenson served on the Lewiston City Council.

Stevenson died on May 11, 2020, at age 75, from complications of a heart attack she suffered a week prior.

References

External links
Thyra Stevenson at the Idaho Legislature
 Thyra Stevenson's Campaign site
 Biography at Ballotpedia
 Financial information (state office) at the National Institute for Money in State Politics
 Thyra Stevenson at nezperceswcd.org
 2013 Thyra Stevenson at idahopress.com

1944 births
2020 deaths
21st-century American women politicians
Boston University College of Arts and Sciences alumni
Female United States Coast Guard personnel
Women military aviators
Idaho city council members
Republican Party members of the Idaho House of Representatives
Aviators from California
Military personnel from California
New York University alumni
People from Lewiston, Idaho
People from Palo Alto, California
University of Washington alumni
Women state legislators in Idaho
21st-century American politicians
Women city councillors in Idaho